
Gmina Babice is a rural gmina (administrative district) in Chrzanów County, Lesser Poland Voivodeship, in southern Poland.

The gmina contains part of the protected area called Tenczynek Landscape Park.

Villages
Gmina Babice contains the villages and settlements of Babice, Jankowice, Mętków, Olszyny, Rozkochów, Włosień, Wygiełzów and Zagórze.

Neighbouring gminas
Gmina Babice is bordered by the gminas of Alwernia, Chrzanów, Libiąż, Przeciszów and Zator.

References
Polish official population figures 2006

Babice
Chrzanów County